Ardan Lopsonovich Angarkhaev is a Russian poet and writer of Buryat origin. He was born in 1946 in the village of Tablangut in Tunkinsky district of Buryatia. He graduated from the Toltoy Secondary School (1966), and then studied in the physics and mathematics faculty of the Buryat State Pedagogical Institute (1970). He worked as a physics teacher at the Torskoy secondary school (1970-1976), as an employee of the Sayany newspaper (1976-1978), and as an editor at the Buryat book publishing house (1980-1986). He served as editor-in-chief of the Buryad newspaper Unen from 1996 to 2010.

He was elected People's Deputy of the Supreme Soviet of the USSR (1989). He was also chairman of the Writers' Union of Buryatia (2000-2006).

Literary career
He began his literary career as a poet. His first poems were published in 1959 in the regional newspaper Krasnoye Znamya. His poetry collections include "Amiskhal" (1985), "Aguuehe shedi" ("Pulse of the Universe") (2001), "Amids zurhenei shugan" ("And life, and heart and blood") (2005), etc. His early prose works appeared in the late 1960s and early 1970s. His short story "Suranzan" ("The Power of Attraction"), published in 1972, is considered a classic of Buryat literature.

His collections of stories include "Altan" ("Gold") (1977), "Oroin sagaan odon" ("Finest hour") (1987), "Goddess on earth" (2001), "Refutation of the legend, or the bloodthirsty east" (2004). In 1982, his first novel "Mankhe nogoon hasuuri" ("Eternal Blossom") was published. In 2003, he published a collection of essays and journalism "Lightning and Leaves". In 2005–2008, he wrote the epic work "Heaven and Earth", published in 4 volumes and translated into Russian by the author himself.

Angarkhaev is also a dramatist. His first play "The Golden Ring" was staged at the Buryat State Academic Drama Theater named after Khotsa Namsaraev in 1975. Many of his plays have been performed, e.g. "Mountain Peaks" (1977), "Magic Dacha on Arshan" (1978), "Full Moon" (1980), "A Night Without Sleep" (1982), " Waiting" (1984), etc. The plays "Red Flowers", "Arches deere" ("On the Bridge"), the phantasmagoria "The President's Gold" have been staged by the folk theater of Buryatia.

He has won awards such as the Lenin Komsomol Prize of Buryatia for the play "Mountain Peak" (1978), and various prizes within Russia, Belarus and Mongolia (2003). His works have been translated into Russian, Tuvan, Altai, Mongolian and French.

References

Buryat writers